Marc Bernier (born 19 April 1943 in Le Mans) was a member of the 13th National Assembly of France, until 19 June 2012. He represented the Mayenne department, and is a member of the Union for a Popular Movement.

References

1943 births
Living people
People from Le Mans
Rally for the Republic politicians
Union for a Popular Movement politicians
United Republic politicians
Deputies of the 12th National Assembly of the French Fifth Republic
Deputies of the 13th National Assembly of the French Fifth Republic